Before being elected President of the United States, Donald Trump had produced and hosted reality TV shows The Apprentice and The Celebrity Apprentice from 2004 to 2015. He also made dozens of cameo appearances in films, television series, and advertisements since the 1980s. He has won the Worst Supporting Actor award at the 11th Golden Raspberry Awards for Ghosts Can't Do It in 1990, as well as awards for Worst Actor and Worst screen Combo at the 39th Golden Raspberry Awards for his roles in the documentary films Death of a Nation and Fahrenheit 11/9 in 2019.

Appearances by Trump

Film

Television

Video 
Trump has appeared in three VHS tapes released by Playboy. He did not appear in any scenes containing nudity or sexual content.

Music videos

In 1989, Trump appeared in the music video for Bobby Brown's single "On Our Own", which was featured in the movie Ghostbusters II. In 1991, Trump originally made an appearance in the music video for Precious Metal's cover of Janet Robin's song, "Mr. Big Stuff". However, Trump wanted a $250,000 payment instead of the agreed-upon $10,000 appearance fee. After the band refused to pay for his appearance, Trump was replaced in the final version of the music video. He also appeared in an I Like Trains song The Truth.

Advertising
Trump has also appeared in a number of television commercials for Pizza Hut. The first of these commercials aired in the United States in 1995, and featured him and his ex-wife Ivana promoting Stuffed Crust pizzas. The second of these commercials aired in the Australian market in 2000, and was for large 'New Yorker' pizzas the chain was promoting at the time. In 2002, Trump appeared in three McDonald's commercials featuring Grimace.

Other brands that Trump appeared in commercials for included Pepsi, Macy's, Oreo, Serta, Verizon, and Visa.

Works about Trump

Film

Television

Films or TV series alluding to Trump
 In a 1988 episode, Sesame Street introduced the character Donald Grump, a scheming landlord Muppet who takes over Oscar the Grouch's trash can home and replaces it with "Grump Tower", then tries to evict Oscar from his own turf.
 In the 1989 film Lethal Weapon 2, Roger Murtaugh (Danny Glover) describes the money in the shipping container as billions of Donald Trump Lotto.
 In the 1989 film Back to the Future Part II, Biff Tannen (Thomas F. Wilson) turns Hill Valley's courthouse into a gaudy casino/hotel (à la the Trump Plaza hotel) where he lives an obnoxiously luxurious lifestyle. In his office is a portrait of himself that was based on one of Donald Trump. Co-writer Bob Gale says that the Trump connection was definitely intentional.
 The 1989 film Do the Right Thing references Trump, when pizzeria owner Sal jokes about selling his business to build condominiums named "Trump's Pizza" or "Trump's Plaza".
 In the 1989 Woody Allen film Crimes and Misdemeanors, Alan Alda's character, Lester, says, "Idea for series - a wealthy, high-profile builder who's always trying to realize grandiose dreams, à la Donald Trump, to be shot in New York."
 In the 1990 film Gremlins 2: The New Batch, John Glover's character Daniel Clamp is based on both Trump and Ted Turner. Clamp is a bajillionaire who owns construction companies, sports teams, consumer products lines and the film takes place in the Clamp building.
 In a 1990 episode of Growing Pains, Donald Trump hand delivers a large donation off camera while the Seaver family is showering and getting ready to host a charity clinic fundraiser. It is mentioned several times that he may attend in order to get the family members to hurry the preparations.
 In the 1992 Quantum Leap episode "It's A Wonderful Leap", Dr. Sam Beckett leaps back in time as a 1950s cab driver who mentions there "will be lot of money in real estate", before finding out his passengers are teenage Donald Trump and his father Fred Trump.
 Just Shoot Me! features Trump as an unseen character who serves as a rival to one of the series' protagonists, Jack Gallo.
 In the 1992 film Batman Returns, Christopher Walken's character Max Shreck, a corrupt business tycoon with eccentric hair who seeks to bring Gotham City under his control, is based mostly on Trump. 
 In 1994, actor Joe Pesci portrayed "Ronald Grump," an evil real estate developer who wants to tear down Sesame Street in Sesame Street Stars and Street Forever.
 In the 1994 cartoon Biker Mice from Mars, there is a villain based on Trump called Lawrence Limburger, who sells Limburger branded products and lives in the luxurious "Limburger Plaza" tower.
 In the 1994 TV show Weinerville, episode "Weinerville For Sale" features a character called Donald Rump who tries to buy out Weinerville to make room for a casino.
 In the 1995 film Die Hard with a Vengeance, a switchboard operator facetiously suggests she is going to "marry Donald Trump" in response to what she perceives as an unreasonable request from her supervisor.
 In the 1997 film Money Talks during a luxury car auction, Chris Tucker's character asks "where is Trump?"
 In the 1997 film The Devil's Advocate during a party scene, a character says "Trump was supposed to be here".
 In the 1998 film A Night at the Roxbury, Doug Butabi (Chris Kattan) says: "Last night we made some very important business contacts" for which his father Kamehl Butabi replies: "Really!? Doing what? Dancing the Macarena with Donald Trump?"
 In The Simpsons season 11, episode 17 "Bart to the Future", there is a mention that Donald Trump became president in the future and caused a budget crisis that Lisa inherits.
 In the 2000 film Romeo Must Die, a character played by DMX refers to Trump.
 In the 2000 film American Psycho, Patrick Bateman briefly mentions Trump, saying "Is that Donald Trump's car?" while looking out a taxi window. Trump's then (as of the setting of the film) wife Ivana Trump is also mentioned in a different scene.
 In the 2002 TV film Live from Baghdad Mr. Mazin references Donald Trump's book Cash is king, then goes on to say it was amazing.
 In the 2004 film Million Dollar Baby, there is an advertisement on the side of a bus for The Apprentice TV show with a photo of Donald Trump on it.
In Friends Season 4, episode 11 "The One with Phoebe's Uterus", Joey walks in wearing a blue blazer to which Chandler gets tongue-tied while delivering his joke: "I don't know, but Donald Trump wants his blue blazer black."
 In Friends Season 5, episode 5 "The One with the Kips", Chandler tells Joey he saw Donald Trump waiting for an elevator during his business trip. Joey later finds out that Monica also saw Donald Trump waiting for an elevator during her business trip. This leads Joey to conclude that Monica and Chandler actually spent the weekend together.
 In American Dad! season 1, episode 2 "Threat Levels", after Stan Smith says "you're fired!", Donald Trump shows up and Stan reacts saying "Oh for God's sake, somebody pay Mr. Trump!". Later in the episode, Stan says "you were fired", Trump shows up again, but this time Stan replies "That's passive tense Trump, you don't own that".
 In the series finale of The Sopranos, when Tony Soprano and his son A.J. are discussing the latter's career plans, A.J. suggests that after he serves in the Army as a helicopter pilot, he hopes to become a personal pilot for someone like Trump. Later in the episode, when he also suggests joining the Central Intelligence Agency after serving in the Army, Tony mockingly asks if "the Donald" is going to let him take time off work to join the CIA.
 In the 2009 film Whatever Works, Marietta says to her daughter Melody when they are in front of a wax figure of Donald Trump "Oh, sweet pea, sweet pea, this is the kind of man you should be married to..."
 In the 2010 film Morning Glory, Becky Fuller tried to have legendary news anchor Mike Pomeroy do a morning show segment on Trump and he refuses.
 In the 2012 film Battleship, one of the characters makes a reference to Trump's virility.
 In the 2012 film Gambit by Michael Hoffman, Trump is mentioned at the end. 
 In the 2013 film The Incredible Burt Wonderstone after Burt Wonderstone loses his show at Bally's Hotel, he calls Steve Wynn, Donald Trump and other hotel owners asking for a job.
 In Castle season 3 episode 7 "Almost Famous", detective Ryan says the victim had a bunch of Donald Trump finance books to which Castle replied that he probably wanted a job on The Apprentice.
 In Castle season 6 episode 3 "Need to Know", detective Esposito jokes of a former child actor going on a reality show begging Donald Trump for a job.
 In Zoey 101 season 1, episode 3 "Webcam", after Kazu fires Logan he says "I feel like Donald Trump."

Awards and nominations
Golden Raspberry Awards

Primetime Emmy Awards

Teen Choice Awards

Notes

References

External links 
 
 
 

Filmography
Films about Donald Trump
Trump filmography
American filmographies